Heiko Nossek (born 14 March 1982 in Esslingen) is a German water polo player who competed in the 2004 Summer Olympics and in the 2008 Summer Olympics. He played for various teams in Europe. For the 2006-07 season, Nossek played for Greek traditional club, Ethnikos.

References

1982 births
Living people
German male water polo players
Olympic water polo players of Germany
Water polo players at the 2004 Summer Olympics
Water polo players at the 2008 Summer Olympics

Ethnikos Piraeus Water Polo Club players